Antigua and Barbuda has competed at every edition of the Pan American Games since the eighth edition of the multi-sport event in 1979. However, Antigua and Barbuda participated in the 1959 Pan American Games as part of the British West Indies and future Prime Minister Lester Bird won a bronze medal in the long jump. Sprinter Heather Samuel won Antigua and Barbuda's first Pan Am medal in 1995, a bronze in the women's 100 metres. Sprinter, Brendan Christian won Antigua and Barbuda's first gold medal at the 2007 Pan American Games. To date, all five of Antigua and Barbuda's medals have been won in the sport of track and field. Antigua and Barbuda did not compete at the first and only Pan American Winter Games in 1990.

Medal count 

To sort the tables by host city, total medal count, or any other column, click on the  icon next to the column title.

Summer

Winter

References